The State House is the official residence of the President of Sierra Leone. It is home to the offices of the president, senior presidential staff and associated aides. The State House is located at State Avenue, Tower Hill, in central Freetown.

History
The State House is located on State Avenue, Tower Hill, in central Freetown. Built in 1895, it was initially called Fort Thornton. During the colonial period it was used as the residence of the Governor of Sierra Leone. It was the official residence of the Prime Minister of Sierra Leone from 19611971, after which it became the residence of the president.

Security 
As the residence of the president of Sierra Leone, the State House is constantly protected by the Presidential Guard. The Guard is a special unit of the Sierra Leone Armed Forces. The Sierra Leone Police, who are responsible for road traffic control around the State House,  clear traffic and assist with security when the presidential convoy moves within any part of the country.

The State House is closed to the general public, and only authorized persons and vehicles are permitted access.

Staff

The president's senior staff members have offices inside the State House. These include the office of the president's Chief Minister, Chief of Staff,  and the presidential press secretary. The offices of the Aide de camp to the president, the Ministry of Political Affairs, the national security adviser to the president, the senior political advisors to the president, and the senior economic advisers to the president are all located with the State House.

References

External links 
 Official website of the Republic of Sierra Leone State House

Buildings and structures in Freetown
Government Houses of the British Empire and Commonwealth
Official residences
Government buildings completed in 1895
Houses completed in 1895